Udea thermantis is a moth of the family Crambidae. It is endemic to the Hawaiian islands of Kauai, Oahu, Molokai, Maui and Hawaii.

The larvae feed on Phyllostegia species. The caterpillars are about 18 mm long with a pale yellowish head with brown mosaic on the upper half, a small black dot in the middle of each lobe in the front and black eyes.

External links

Moths described in 1899
Endemic moths of Hawaii
thermantis